Jack Halpern (19 January 1925 – 31 January 2018) was an inorganic chemist, the Louis Block Distinguished Service Professor of Chemistry at the University of Chicago. Born in Poland, he moved to Canada in 1929 and the United States in 1962.

His research focused on mechanistic organometallic chemistry, especially homogeneous catalysis, beginning with early work on the activation of hydrogen by soluble complexes.  He contributed to elucidation of the mechanism of the hydrogenation of alkenes by Wilkinson's catalyst and the stereodetermining step in certain asymmetric hydrogenation processes.  Related areas of interest include the reactivity of metal-carbon bonds, e.g., in cobalamins and pentacyanocobaltate derivatives.

He was elected a Fellow of the Royal Society in 1974. From the American Chemical Society he won the Willard Gibbs Award (1986), and awards for Inorganic Chemistry, Organometallic Chemistry, and the Distinguished Service in Inorganic Chemistry, the latter in partial recognition of his editorship of the Journal of the American Chemical Society.

References

1925 births
2018 deaths
American chemists
American people of Polish-Jewish descent
Canadian chemists
Canadian emigrants to the United States
Jewish Canadian scientists
Canadian people of Polish-Jewish descent
Fellows of the Royal Society
Jewish American scientists
Jewish chemists
Members of the United States National Academy of Sciences
Polish emigrants to Canada
University of Chicago faculty
20th-century Canadian scientists
20th-century American scientists
21st-century American scientists
Academic staff of the University of British Columbia
Scientists from British Columbia
21st-century American Jews